Miguel Ángel Gutiérrez La Rosa (born 19 November 1956) is a Peruvian football midfielder who played for Peru in the 1982 FIFA World Cup. He also played for Sporting Cristal.

References

External links
 
FIFA profile

1956 births
Living people
Peruvian footballers
Peru international footballers
Association football midfielders
Sporting Cristal footballers
Club Universitario de Deportes footballers
1982 FIFA World Cup players